Archonias is a monotypic genus of butterflies in the family Pieridae. Archonias brassolis, the cattleheart white, is its sole species. It is found from Central America, south through most of South America.

The wingspan is 56–65 mm for A. b. rubrosparsa and 31–34 mm for A. b. approximata.

Although Archonias brassolis is a member of the whites family, it is primarily black, with red hindwing patches and white forewing patches. It is geographically variable, with some forms being remarkable mimics of various Parides swallowtails, while others strongly resemble Heliconius. It is likely that these butterflies are themselves unpalatable and thus Müllerian mimics.

The larvae feed on Loranthaceae species and are gregarious. Adults of A. b. approximata have been recorded feeding on the nectar of Eupatorium species.

Subspecies
A. b. approximata (Guatemala, Honduras, Costa Rica, Panama)
A. b. brassolis (Surinam, Guianas)
A. b. critias (Venezuela, Colombia)
A. b. cutila (Ecuador)
A. b. marcias (Brazil)
A. b. negrina (Ecuador, Bolivia, Argentina, Peru)
A. b. nigripennis (Colombia)
A. b. rosacea (Ecuador, Venezuela)
A. b. rubrosparsa (Ecuador)
A. b. tereas (Brazil)

There is also one undescribed subspecies from Colombia.

External links
Species page at the Tree of Life

Pierini
Fauna of Brazil
Pieridae of South America
Monotypic butterfly genera
Taxa named by Jacob Hübner
Pieridae genera